Daerden is a surname. Notable people with the surname include:

Frédéric Daerden (born 1970), Belgian politician and a member of the French-speaking Socialist Party
Jos Daerden (born 1954), Belgian football manager and footballer
Koen Daerden (born 1982), Belgian footballer
Michel Daerden (1949–2012), Belgian politician